Vladimir Mikhailovich Uralsky was a Soviet actor. Vladimir played in more than 100 films.

Selected filmography 
 1924 — Aelita
 1925 — Strike
 1925 — Battleship Potemkin
 1930 — St. Jorgen's Day
 1939 — The Fighters
 1946 — The Great Glinka
 1948 — The Young Guard
 1948 — First-Year Student

References

Soviet male silent film actors

External links 
 Владимир Уральский on kino-teatr.ru

1887 births
1955 deaths
Soviet male film actors